Utricularia nervosa is a terrestrial carnivorous plant that belongs to the genus Utricularia (family Lentibulariaceae). It is endemic to South America where it can be found in Argentina, Brazil, Colombia, Paraguay, and Venezuela.

See also 
 List of Utricularia species

References 

Carnivorous plants of South America
Flora of Argentina
Flora of Brazil
Flora of Colombia
Flora of Paraguay
Flora of Venezuela
nervosa
Plants described in 1847